Jeffrey Michael Fleming (born February 10, 1966) is an American bishop of the Catholic Church who has been serving as coadjutor bishop of the Diocese of Great Falls-Billings in Montana since 2022.

Biography

Early life 
Jeffrey Fleming was born in Billings, Montana, on February 10, 1966, to Mike and Glenda (nee Gibson) Fleming, and raised in Belt, Montana, along with two sisters He received his sacraments of Confession, First Holy Communion and Confirmation at Saint Mark's Catholic Church.

Fleming  obtained a bachelor's degree in theology and religious education at Carroll College in Helena in 1988. He earned his master's degree in theology at Mount Angel Seminary in Saint Benedict, Oregon, in 1992 and his licentiate in canon law from The Catholic University of America in Washington, D.C., in 1998.

Priesthood 
Fleming was ordained a priest of the Diocese of Helena on May 19, 1992 by Eldon F. Curtiss, Bishop of Helena. After his ordination, Fleming served the following pastoral roles in Montana:

 Parish vicar of the Anaconda Catholic Community in Anaconda in 1992 and of the Saint Helena Cathedral in 1996
 Chaplain of Carroll College in 1998 
 Pastor of Saint Rose of Lima Parish in Dillon in 2003, of Christ the King Parish in Missoula in 2006, of Saint John the Baptist Parish in Frenchtown in 2013, of Saint Michael Parish in Drummond and of Saint Philip Parish in Philipsburg in 2016
 Administrator of Saint Thomas the Apostle Parish in Helmville and of Saint Jude parish in Lincoln in 2019

For the diocese, Fleming was a member of the priests council and of the College of Consultors. From 2020 to 2022, he was chancellor, moderator of the diocesan curia and adjunct judicial vicar. He also served as the bishop's delegate to the school board of Missoula Catholic Schools.

In response to a 2020 instruction from the Vatican's Congregation for the Clergy regarding role of the parish in view of the institutional decline of the Catholic Church, Fleming said that the document stresses that every member of a parish is called to be a "witness of Christ, a light to the world...Pope Francis is calling us to be a church that looks outwardly, not just inside the church itself... To bring more people to the table, especially the poor and marginalized."

Bishop of Great Falls-Billings 
Pope Francis appointed Fleming as coadjutor bishop of the Diocese of Great Falls-Billings on April 19, 2022. Fleming was consecrated  by Bishop Michael Warfel as bishop in Great Falls on June 22 at Holy Spirit Catholic Church.  Bishop George Leo Thomas was to have served as one of his co-consecrators but tested positive for COVID-19.  Archbishop Alexander Sample served in his place.

See also

 Catholic Church hierarchy
 Catholic Church in the United States
 Historical list of the Catholic bishops of the United States
 List of Catholic bishops of the United States
 Lists of patriarchs, archbishops, and bishops

References

External links

Roman Catholic Diocese of Great Falls-Billings Official Site  
Roman Catholic Diocese of Helena Official Site
"Father Jeffrey Fleming"l - Catholic Hierarchy.

   

1966 births
Living people
American Roman Catholic priests
Bishops appointed by Pope Francis
People from Billings, Montana
Catholics from Montana